The Sovereign Military Order of Malta (SMOM), officially the Sovereign Military Hospitaller Order of Saint John of Jerusalem, of Rhodes and of Malta, commonly known as the Order of Malta or Knights of Malta, is a Catholic lay religious order, traditionally of a military, chivalric, and noble nature. Though it possesses no territory, the order is often considered a sovereign entity of international law, as it maintains diplomatic relations with many countries.

The order claims continuity with the Knights Hospitaller, a chivalric order that was founded about 1099 by the Blessed Gerard in the Kingdom of Jerusalem. The order is led by an elected prince and grand master. The order venerates the Virgin Mary as its patroness, under the title of Our Lady of Philermos. 

The Order's membership includes about 13,500 Knights, Dames and Chaplains. Thirty-eight of these are professed religious Knights of Justice. Until the 1990s, the highest classes of membership, including officers, required proof of noble lineage. More recently, a path was created for Knights and Dames of the lowest class (of whom proof of aristocratic lineage is not required) to be specially elevated to the highest class, making them eligible for office in the order.

The Order's modern-day role is largely focused on providing humanitarian assistance and assisting with international humanitarian relations, for which purpose it has had permanent observer status at the United Nations General Assembly since 1994. The Order employs about 52,000 doctors, nurses, auxiliaries and paramedics assisted by 95,000 volunteers in more than 120 countries, assisting children, homeless, disabled, elderly, and terminally ill people, refugees, and lepers around the world without distinction of ethnicity or religion. Through its worldwide relief corps, Malteser International, the order aids victims of natural disasters, epidemics and war.

The Order maintains diplomatic relations with 112 states, enters into treaties, and issues its own passports, coins and postage stamps. Its two headquarters buildings in Rome enjoy extraterritoriality, similar to embassies, and it maintains embassies in other countries. The  news agency has called it "the smallest sovereign state in the world". The three principal officers are counted as citizens. Although the Order has been a United Nations General Assembly observer since 1994, this was granted in view of its "long-standing dedication [...] in providing humanitarian assistance and its special role in international humanitarian relations"; the same category is held by other non-state entities such as the International Olympic Committee and International Committee of the Red Cross.

Name and insignia 

The Order has a large number of Priories, Sub-Priories, and National Associations around the world, but there also exist a number of organizations with similar-sounding names that are unrelated to the Order.  These include a number of mimic orders, including Masonic and non-Catholic organizations.

The Order has two flags. The state flag is a rectangular flag with a red ground upon which there is a white Latin cross. The flag of the Order's works is a rectangular flag with a red ground upon which there is a white eight-pointed Maltese cross.

The Grand Master uses a rectangular flag with a red ground upon which there is a white eight-pointed Maltese cross, encircled by the Collar of the Order and surmounted by a crown.

The coat-of-arms of the Order, gules a cross argent (a white/silver cross on a red field), are displayed in an oval shield surrounded by a rosary, all superimposed on a white eight-pointed cross and displayed under a princely mantle surmounted by a crown.

In the ecclesiastical heraldry of the Catholic Church, the Order of Malta is one of only two orders (along with the Order of the Holy Sepulchre) whose insignia may be displayed in a clerical coat of arms. (Laypersons have no such restriction.) The shield is surrounded with a silver rosary for professed knights, or for others the ribbon of their rank. Some members may also display the Maltese cross behind their shield instead of the ribbon.

In order to protect its heritage against fraud, the Order has legally registered sixteen versions of its names and emblems in some one hundred countries.

History of the Order of Saint John

Founding 

The birth of the Knights Hospitaller dates back to around 1048. Merchants from the ancient Marine Republic of Amalfi obtained from the Caliph of Egypt the authorisation to build a church, convent, and hospital in Jerusalem, to care for pilgrims of any religious faith or race. The Order of St. John of Jerusalem – the monastic community that ran the hospital for the pilgrims in the Holy Land – became independent under the guidance of its founder, the religious brother Gerard.

With the Papal bull Pie postulatio voluntatis dated 15 February 1113, Pope Paschal II approved the foundation of the Hospital and placed it under the aegis of the Holy See, granting it the right to freely elect its superiors without interference from other secular or religious authorities. By virtue of the Papal Bull, the hospital became an order exempt from the control of the local church. All the Knights were religious, bound by the three monastic vows of poverty, chastity and obedience.

The constitution of the Christian Kingdom of Jerusalem during the Crusades obliged the order to take on the military defence of the sick, the pilgrims, and the captured territories. The order thus added the task of defending the faith to that of its hospitaller mission.

As time went on, the order adopted the white, eight-pointed Cross that is still its symbol today. The eight points represent the eight beatitudes that Jesus pronounced in his Sermon on the Mount.

Cyprus 
When the last Christian stronghold in the Holy Land fell after the Siege of Acre in 1291, the order settled first in Cyprus.

Rhodes

In 1310, led by Grand Master Fra' Foulques de Villaret, the knights regrouped on the island of Rhodes. From there, the defense of the Christian world required the organization of a naval force; so the Order built a powerful fleet and sailed the eastern Mediterranean, fighting battles for the sake of Christendom, including Crusades in Syria and Egypt.

In the early 14th century, the institutions of the Order and the knights who came to Rhodes from every corner of Europe were grouped according to the languages they spoke. The first seven such groups, or Langues (Tongues) – from Provence, Auvergne, France, Italy, Aragon (Navarre), England (with Scotland and Ireland), and Germany – became eight in 1492, when Castile and Portugal were separated from the Langue of Aragon. Each Langue included Priories or Grand Priories, Bailiwicks, and Commanderies.

The Order was governed by its Grand Master, the Prince of Rhodes, and its Council. From its beginning, independence from other nations granted by pontifical charter and the universally recognised right to maintain and deploy armed forces constituted grounds for the international sovereignty of the Order, which minted its own coins and maintained diplomatic relations with other states. The senior positions of the Order were given to representatives of different Langues.

In 1523, after six months of siege and fierce combat against the fleet and army of Sultan Suleiman the Magnificent, the walls collapsed from undermining explosives, and by a negotiated surrender the Knights left Rhodes carrying their arms.

Malta 

The Order remained without a territory of its own until 1530, when Grand Master Fra' Philippe de Villiers de l'Isle Adam took possession of the island of Malta, granted to the order by Emperor Charles V, Holy Roman Emperor and his mother Queen Joanna of Castile as monarchs of Sicily, with the approval of Pope Clement VII, for which the order had to honour the conditions of the Tribute of the Maltese Falcon.

In 1565, the Knights, led by Grand Master Fra' Jean de Vallette (after whom the capital of Malta, Valletta, was named), defended the island for more than three months during the Great Siege by the Ottomans.

The fleet of the Order contributed to the ultimate destruction of the Ottoman naval power in the Battle of Lepanto in 1571, led by John of Austria, half brother of King Philip II of Spain.

The Reformation which split Western Europe into Protestant and Catholic states affected the knights as well. In several countries, including England, Scotland and Sweden, the order was dissolved. In others, including the Netherlands and Germany, entire bailiwicks or commanderies (administrative divisions of the order) experienced Protestant conversions; these "Johanniter orders" survive in Germany, the Netherlands, and Sweden and many other countries, including the United States and South Africa. It was established that the order should remain neutral in any war between Christian nations.

From 1651 to 1665, the Order ruled four islands in the Caribbean. On 21 May 1651 it acquired the islands of Saint Barthélemy, Saint Christopher, Saint Croix and Saint Martin. These were purchased from the French Compagnie des Îles de l'Amérique which had just been dissolved. In 1665, the four islands were sold to the French West India Company.

In 1798, Napoleon led the French occupation of Malta. Napoleon demanded from Grand Master Ferdinand von Hompesch zu Bolheim that his ships be allowed to enter the port and to take on water and supplies. The Grand Master replied that only two foreign ships could be allowed to enter the port at a time. Bonaparte, aware that such a procedure would take a very long time and would leave his forces vulnerable to British Admiral Horatio Nelson, immediately ordered a cannon fusillade against Malta. The French soldiers disembarked in Malta at seven points on the morning of 11 June and attacked. After several hours of fierce fighting, the Maltese in the west were forced to surrender.

Napoleon opened negotiations with the fortress capital of Valletta. Faced with vastly superior French forces and the loss of western Malta, the Grand Master negotiated a surrender to the invasion. Hompesch left Malta for Trieste on 18 June. He resigned as Grand Master on 6 July 1799.

The knights were dispersed, though the Order continued to exist in a diminished form and negotiated with European governments for a return to power as part of the agreement between France and Holy Roman Empire during the German mediatisation. The Russian Emperor, Paul I, gave the largest number of knights shelter in Saint Petersburg, an action which gave rise to the Russian tradition of the Knights Hospitaller and the Order's recognition among the Russian Imperial Orders. The refugee knights in Saint Petersburg proceeded to elect Tsar Paul as their Grand Master – a rival to Grand Master von Hompesch until the latter's abdication left Paul as the sole Grand Master. Grand Master Paul I created, in addition to the Roman Catholic Grand Priory, a "Russian Grand Priory" of no fewer than 118 Commanderies, dwarfing the rest of the Order and open to all Christians. Paul's election as Grand Master was, however, never ratified under Roman Catholic canon law, and he was the de facto rather than de jure Grand Master of the Order.

By the early 19th century, the Order was severely weakened by the loss of its priories throughout Europe. Only 10% of the order's income came from traditional sources in Europe, with the remaining 90% being generated by the Russian Grand Priory until 1810. This was partly reflected in the government of the Order being under Lieutenants, rather than Grand Masters, in the period 1805 to 1879, when Pope Leo XIII restored a Grand Master to the order. This signaled the renewal of the Order's fortunes as a humanitarian and religious organization.

On 19 September 1806, the Swedish government offered the sovereignty of the island of Gotland to the Order. The offer was rejected since it would have meant the Order renouncing their claim to Malta.

Exile
The French forces occupying Malta expelled the Knights Hospitaller from the country.

During the seventeen years that separated the seizure of Malta and the General Peace, "the formality of electing a brother Chief to discharge the office of Grand Master, and thus to preserve the vitality of the Sovereign Institute, was duty attended to". The office of Lieutenant of the Magistery and ad interim of Grand Master was held by the Grand Baillies Field Marshal Counto Soltikoff, Giovanni Tommasi, De Gaevera, Giovanni y Centelles, De Candida and the Count Colloredo. Their mandates complexively covered the period until the death of the Emperor Paul in 1801.

The Treaty of Amiens (1802) obliged the United Kingdom to evacuate Malta which was to be restored to a recreated Order of St. John, whose sovereignty was to be guaranteed by all of the major European powers, to be determined at the final peace. However, this was not to be because objections to the treaty quickly grew in the United Kingdom.

Bonaparte's rejection of a British offer involving a ten-year lease of Malta prompted the reactivation of the British blockade of the French coast; Britain declared war on France on 18 May.

The 1802 treaty was never implemented. The United Kingdom resumed hostilities citing France's imperialist policies in the West Indies, Italy, and Switzerland.

Sovereign Military Order of Malta

The Congress of Vienna of 1815 confirmed the loss of Malta. After having temporarily resided in Messina, Catania, and Ferrara, the seat of the order was moved to Ferrara in 1826 and to Rome in 1834. The Magistral Palace in Via Condotti 68 and the Magistral Villa on the Aventine Hill enjoy extraterritorial status. The grand priories of Lombardy-Venetia and of Sicily were restored from 1839 to 1841. The office of Grand Master was restored by Pope Leo XIII in 1879, after a vacancy of 75 years, confirming Giovanni Battista Ceschi a Santa Croce as the first Grand Master of the restored Order of Malta. However, the loss of possession of Malta during this period did not affect the right of active and passive legation for the Order, which is legally important for the absolute continuity of international status, regardless of the former territorial possession.

The original hospitaller mission became the main activity of the order, growing ever stronger during the 20th century, most especially because of the contribution of the activities carried out by the Grand Priories and National Associations in many countries around the world. Large-scale hospitaller and charitable activities were carried out during World Wars I and II under Grand Master Fra' Ludovico Chigi Albani della Rovere (1931–1951). Under the Grand Masters Fra' Angelo de Mojana di Cologna (1962–88) and Fra' Andrew Bertie (1988–2008), the projects expanded.

In February 2013, the Order celebrated the 900th anniversary of its papal recognition with a general audience with Pope Benedict XVI and a Mass celebrated by Cardinal Tarcisio Bertone in Saint Peter's Basilica.

Constitutional reform 
The Order experienced a leadership crisis beginning in December 2016, when Albrecht Freiherr von Boeselager protested his removal as Grand Chancellor by Grand Master Fra' Matthew Festing.
In January 2017 Pope Francis ordered von Boeselager reinstated and required Festing's resignation. Francis also named Archbishop (later Cardinal) Giovanni Becciu as his personal representative to the Order – sidelining the Order's Cardinal Patron Raymond Burke – until the election of a new Grand Master. The pope effectively taking control over the Order was seen by some as a break with tradition and the Order's independence.

In May 2017, the Order named Mauro Bertero Gutiérrez, a Bolivian member of the Government Council, to lead its constitutional reform process. In June 2017, in a departure from tradition, the leadership of the Order wore informal attire rather than formal wear full dress uniforms to their annual papal audience. In May 2018 when a new Grand Master was elected, Francis extended Becciu's mandate indefinitely. When the Order's Chapter General met in May 2019 three of the 62 participants were women for the first time.

On 1 November 2020, Pope Francis named Archbishop (later Cardinal) Silvano Tomasi to replace Becciu as his Special Delegate to the Order, reiterating the responsibilities of that office as his sole representative.

On 3 September 2022, Pope Francis promulgated the new constitution of the Order and made provisional appointments to the Sovereign Council; he scheduled a convocation of the Extraordinary General Chapter for 25 January 2023, when regular appointments can be made in place of his provisional ones. On 26 January, the General Chapter elected to six-year terms on the Sovereign Council the same four members Francis had appointed the previous September and six of the nine Councillors.

Organisation

Governance

The proceedings of the Order are governed by its Constitutional Charter and Code.

The Prince and Grand Master is the head of the order and governs both as sovereign and as religious superior. He is "entitled to sovereign prerogatives and honors as well as the title of "Most Eminent Highness". He is elected to a term of ten years and may be elected to a second term, but may not serve beyond the completion of his 85th year. The last Prince and Grand Master was Fra' Giacomo dalla Torre del Tempio di Sanguinetto who was elected on 2 May 2018 and died 29 April 2020.  "In the event of permanent impediment, resignation or death of the Grand Master, the Order is governed by a Lieutenant ad interim in the person of the Grand Commander, who can only perform acts of ordinary administration without making any innovations."  If it is not possible to elect a Grand Master, a Lieutenant of the Grand Master is elected, who has the same powers as the Grand Master with the exception of the prerogatives of honour pertaining to a sovereign. Both the Lieutenant ad interim and the Lieutenant of the Grand Master are styled Eccellenza (Excellency).

The Sovereign Council is the primary governing body of the Order which deals with regular business.  The members are the Grand Master (or Lieutenant), the holders of the four High Officers (the Grand Commander, the Grand Chancellor, the Grand Hospitaller and the Receiver of the Common Treasure), the five Councilors of the Council of the Professed Knights, and four Councilors.

The Council of the Professed Knights "assists the Grand Master in the spiritual care of the Order and in the governance of the First and Second Class". It includes the Grand Master (or Lieutenant), the Grand Commander, and five Councilors elected by the Chapter of the Professed.

The Chapter General is the legislative body of the Order which meets every five years. It elects the members of the Sovereign Council.

The Council Complete of State elects the Grand Master or the Lieutenant of the Grand Master.

The Board of Auditors audits the Order's finances. It includes a President and four Councillors, all elected by the Chapter General.

The Government Council is the advisory board to the Sovereign Council in charge of studying political, religious, humanitarian assistance and international issues.

The Order's judicial powers are exercised by a group of Magistral Courts, whose judges are appointed by the Grand Master and the Sovereign Council.

Regional divisions

The order is divided regionally into six Grand Priories, six Sub-Priories and 48 associations.

The six Grand Priories are:
 Grand Priory of Rome (founded 1214; expropriated 1808; restored 1816)
 Grand Priory of Lombardy and Venice (founded as two priories about 1180; expropriated 1796–1806; restored as a single priory 1839)
 Grand Priory of Naples and Sicily (founded as the Priory of Messina, the Priory of Barletta, and the Priory of Capua in the 12th and 13th centuries; suppressed 1806–1826; restored as a single priory 1839)
 Grand Priory of Bohemia (founded 1182)
 Grand Priory of Austria (separated from the Grand Priory of Bohemia 1938)
 Grand Priory of England (re-established 1993)

The six Sub-Priories are:
 Sub-Priory of St. Michael (Cologne, Germany)
 Sub-Priory of St. George and St. James (Madrid, Spain)
 Sub-Priory of Our Lady of Philermo (San Francisco, United States)
 Sub-Priory of Our Lady of Lourdes (New York, United States)
 Sub-Priory of The Immaculate Conception (Melbourne, Australia)
 Sub-Priory of St. Oliver Plunkett (Ireland)

Most of the 48 associations are national, but there are several countries (Brazil, Germany, the United States) which have more than one association.

Until the beginning of the nineteenth century the Order was divided regionally into Langues.

Membership 

Membership in the Order is divided into three classes each of which is subdivided into several categories:

 First Class, who make religious vows of poverty, chastity, and obedience:
 Knights of Justice or Professed Knights
 Professed Conventual Chaplains

 Second Class: Knights and Dames in Obedience make a promise, rather than a vow, of obedience:
 Knights and Dames of Honour and Devotion in Obedience
 Knights and Dames of Grace and Devotion in Obedience
 Knights and Dames of Magistral Grace in Obedience

 Third Class, who make no vows or promises:
 Knights and Dames of Honour and Devotion
 Conventual Chaplains ad honorem
 Knights and Dames of Grace and Devotion
 Magistral Chaplains
 Knights and Dames of Magistral Grace
 Donats (male and female) of Devotion

Within each class and category of knights there are ranks of Knight, Knight Grand Cross, and Bailiff Knight Grand Cross.

Bishops and priests are generally admitted as chaplains of the Order of Malta. There are some priests who are knights of the order, usually because they were admitted to the order prior to ordination. The priests of the Order of Malta are ranked as Honorary Canons, as in the Order of the Holy Sepulchre; and they are entitled to wear the black mozetta with purple piping and purple fascia.

Prior to the 1990s, all officers of the order had to be of noble birth (defined differently in different countries), as they were all Knights of Justice or Knights in Obedience. However, Knights of Magistral Grace (i.e. those who do not have proof of noble birth) now may make the Promise of Obedience and, at the discretion of the Grand Master and Sovereign Council, may enter the novitiate to become professed Knights of Justice.

Religious officers

Cardinal Patron 

The Cardinalis Patronus (Cardinal Patron), who is either a cardinal when appointed by the pope or soon raised to that rank, promotes the spiritual interests of the order and its members, and its relations with the Holy See.

 Paolo Giobbe (8 August 1961 – 3 July 1969)
 Giacomo Violardo (3 July 1969 – 17 March 1978)
 Paul-Pierre Philippe, O.P. (10 November 1978 – 9 April 1984)
 Sebastiano Baggio (26 May 1984 – 21 March 1993)
 Pio Laghi (8 May 1993 – 11 January 2009)
 Paolo Sardi (6 June 2009 – 8 November 2014)
 Raymond Burke (8 November 2014–present; sidelined since 2017)

Special delegate
Since 2017, Pope Francis has appointed special delegates to fulfill the role that was previously assigned to the patron.

On 6 February 2017 Pope Francis appointed Archbishop Giovanni Angelo Becciu as his special delegate to the order.

After Becciu resigned from the rights and privileges of a cardinal after being implicated in a financial corruption scandal, Pope Francis appointed Archbishop Silvano Tomasi as his special delegate to the order on 1 November 2020.

Prelate
The Prelate of the order is responsible for the clergy of the order and assists the Grand Master, the Grand Commander and the Coordinator of the Second Class in the care of the spiritual life and in the religious observance of all members of the order.  He is appointed by the Pope on the advice of the Cardinal Patron.

On 4 July 2015 Pope Francis named as Prelate Bishop Jean Laffitte. Laffitte succeeded Archbishop Angelo Acerbi, who had held the office since 2001.

Relationship with other mutually-recognised Orders of Saint John 
The Sovereign Military Order of Malta has collaborated with other mutually-recognized Orders of Saint John; for example, the SMOM is a major donor of the St John Eye Hospital in Jerusalem, which is primarily operated by the Venerable Order of Saint John.

Nuns of the Order
There are three enclosed monasteries of nuns of the Order, two in Spain that date from the 11/12th centuries and one in Malta. The existence of the nuns is not mentioned in the Constitutional Charter or the Code of the Order.

International status 

 

The Order "as a subject of international law, exercises sovereign functions with regard to [its] purposes", namely "promoting the glory of God and the sanctification of its members" and performing works of mercy "towards the sick, the needy, and people without a country without distinction of religion, race, sex, origin and age".

The Order has formal diplomatic relations with 112 states (including the Holy See) and has official relations with another five states and with the European Union. The Order maintains diplomatic missions around the world and many of the states reciprocate by accrediting ambassadors to the Order (usually their ambassador to the Holy See). During the reign of Fra' Andrew Bertie as Prince and Grand Master (1988–2008), the number of nations extending diplomatic relations to the Order more than doubled from 49 to 100.

The Order has observer status at the General Assembly of the United Nations and some of the specialized agencies of the United Nations. One such example is the UN Central Emergency Response Fund, to which it contributed USD $36,000 from 2006–2022. The Order is not classified as a "non-member state" nor as an "intergovernmental organization", but rather as one of the "other entities having received a standing invitation to participate as observers."

The Order has relations with the International Committee of the Red Cross and a number of international organizations.  While the International Telecommunication Union has granted radio identification prefixes to the United Nations and the Palestinian Authority, the Order has never received one. For awards purposes, amateur radio operators consider the Order to be a separate "entity", but stations transmitting from there use an unofficial callsign, starting with the prefix "1A". The Order has neither sought nor been granted a top-level domain for the Internet or an international dialing code for telephone purposes.

The Order's international nature is useful in enabling it to pursue its humanitarian activities without being seen as an operative of any particular nation. Its sovereignty is also expressed in the issuance of passports, licence plates, stamps, and coins.

With its unique history and unusual present circumstances, the exact status of the Order in international law has been the subject of debate. Some scholars have questioned the Order's sovereignty based on the fact that the Order has very limited geographical territories and on account of the Order's relationship with the Holy See. The connection between the Holy See and the Order of Malta was seen as so close as to call into question the actual sovereignty of the order as a separate entity. This has prompted constitutional changes on the part of the Order, which were implemented in 1997. Since then, the Order has been widely recognized as a sovereign subject of international law in its own right.

Some legal experts claim that the Order's claim to sovereignty cannot be maintained.  Wilhelm Wengler rejects the notion that recognition of the Order by some states (for example, the Republic of San Marino in 1939 recognized SMOM as a sovereign state in its own right.) makes it a subject of international law. Ian Brownlie writes that, "Even in the sphere of recognition and bilateral relations, the legal capacities of institutions like the Sovereign Order of Jerusalem and Malta must be limited simply because they lack the territorial and demographic characteristics of states." Helmut Steinberger states that, "With the historical exception of the Holy See, which maintains diplomatic relations with more than 100 States, in contemporary international law only States as distinguished from international organizations or other subjects of international law are accorded sovereignty."

Even taking into account the Order's ambassadorial diplomatic status among many nations, a claim to sovereign status is sometimes rejected.

Other legal experts argue in favour of the Order's claim to sovereignty. Georg Dahm affirms that the Order is a "subject of international law without territory". Berthold Waldstein-Wartenberg writes that the sovereignty of the Order and its personality in international law is "generally recognized by international law doctrine". Gerhard von Glahn affirms that "the Order can be classified as a nonstate subject of international law, although of a somewhat peculiar nature." Rebecca Wallace explains that a sovereign entity does not have to be a country, and that the Order is an example of this.

Relations with the Holy See

On 24 January 1953, the Tribunal of Cardinals appointed by Pope Pius XII stated that, "The quality of the sovereign Order of the institution is functional, that is, aimed at ensuring the achievement of the purposes of the Order itself and its development in the world." The Tribunal of Cardinals further stated that, "The status of sovereign Order...consists in the enjoyment of certain prerogatives inherent to the Order itself as a Subject of international law. These prerogatives, which are proper to sovereigntyin accordance with the principles of international lawand which, following the example of the Holy See, have also been recognized by some States, do not however constitute in the Order that complex of powers and prerogatives, which it belongs to sovereign bodies in the full sense of the word."

On 24 June 1961, Pope John XXIII approved the Constitutional Charter of the Order which stated that "the Order is a legal entity formally approved by the Holy See. It has the quality of a subject of international law" (Article 1) and that "the intimate connection existing between the two qualities of a religious order and a sovereign order do not oppose the autonomy of the order in the exercise of its sovereignty and prerogatives inherent to it as a subject of international law in relation to States." (Article 3)

Relations with Italy

The Order has signed treaties with Italy dated 20 February 1884, 23 December 1915, 4 January 1938, and 1956.

The Supreme Court of Cassation decreed on 6 June 1974 that, "the Sovereign Military Hospitaller Order of Malta constitutes a sovereign international subject, in all terms equal, even if without territory, to a foreign state with which Italy has normal diplomatic relations, so there is no doubt, as already this Supreme Court has warned, that it has the legal treatment of foreign states".

The two most important properties of the Order in Rome – the Palazzo Malta in Via dei Condotti 68, where the Grand Master resides and Government Bodies meet, and the Villa del Priorato di Malta on the Aventine Hill, which hosts the Grand Priory of Rome – as well as the Embassy of the Order to Holy See and the Embassy of the Order to Italy are all recognised as extraterritorial by Italy. As Italy recognizes, in addition to extraterritoriality, the exercise by SMOM of all the prerogatives of sovereignty in its headquarters, Italian sovereignty and SMOM sovereignty uniquely coexist without overlapping.

By a decree of King Victor Emmanuel III of Italy of 28 November 1929, "The Grand Master of the Sovereign Military Order of Malta enjoys in Italy the honors due to the Cardinals, and takes place after them."  Further, "The representation of the Grand Magistry of the Sovereign Military Order of Malta . . . immediately follows the representations of the Foreign Diplomatic Corps." Finally, the decree affirms that the Bailiffs Knights Grand Cross of Justice in Italy shall be styled "Excellency".

The Order is one of the largest landowners in Italy; its properties are exempted from certain Italian fiscal jurisdiction.

Diplomatic vehicles of the Order in Italy receive diplomatic license plates with the code "XA". Other vehicles of the Order receive Italian license plates with the prefix SMOM.

Relations with the Republic of Malta 

Two bilateral treaties have been concluded between the Order and the Republic of Malta. The first treaty, dated 21 June 1991, is now no longer in force. The second treaty was signed on 5 December 1998 and ratified on 1 November 2001.

This agreement grants the Order the use with limited extraterritoriality of the upper portion of Fort St. Angelo in the city of Birgu. Its stated purpose is "to give the Order the opportunity to be better enabled to carry out its humanitarian activities as Knights Hospitallers from Saint Angelo, as well as to better define the legal status of Saint Angelo subject to the sovereignty of Malta over it".

The agreement has a duration of 99 years, but the document allows the Government of Malta to terminate it at any time after 50 years. Under the terms of the agreement, the flag of Malta is to be flown together with the flag of the Order in a prominent position over Fort St. Angelo. No asylum may be granted by the Order and generally the Maltese courts have full jurisdiction and Maltese law shall apply. The second bilateral treaty mentions a number of immunities and privileges, none of which appeared in the earlier treaty.

Currency and postage stamps

The Order's coins are appreciated more as collector's items than for use as currency.

Some 58 countries recognize the Order's postage stamps for franking purposes, including several such as Canada and Mongolia that lack full diplomatic relations with the Order. In 2005, Poste italiane, the Italian postal service, agreed with the Order to deliver internationally most classes of mail other than registered, insured, and special-delivery mail. The Order began issuing euro-denominated postage stamps in 2005, although the scudo remains the official currency of the Order.

Military Corps

The Order states that it was the hospitaller role that enabled the Order to survive the end of the crusading era; nonetheless, it retains its military title and traditions.

On 26 March 1876, the Association of the Italian Knights of the Sovereign Military Order of Malta (Associazione dei cavalieri italiani del sovrano militare ordine di Malta, ACISMOM) reformed the Order's military to a modern military unit of the era. This unit provided medical support to the Italian Army and on 9 April 1909 the military corps officially became a special auxiliary volunteer corps of the Italian Army under the name Corpo Militare dell'Esercito dell'ACISMOM (Army Military Corps of the ACISMOM), wearing Italian uniforms. Since then the Military Corps have operated with the Italian Army both in wartime and peacetime in medical or paramedical military functions, and in ceremonial functions for the Order, such as standing guard around the coffins of high officers of the Order before and during funeral rites.

Air force

In 1947, after the post-World War II peace treaty forbade Italy to own or operate bomber aircraft and only operate a limited number of transport aircraft, the Italian Air Force opted to transfer some of its Savoia-Marchetti SM.82 aircraft to the Sovereign Military Order of Malta, pending the definition of their exact status (the SM.82 were properly long range transport aircraft that could be adapted for bombing missions). These aircraft were operated by Italian Air Force personnel temporarily flying for the Order, carried the Order's roundels on the fuselage and Italian ones on the wings, and were used mainly for standard Italian Air Force training and transport missions but also for some humanitarian tasks proper of the Order of Malta (like the transport of sick pilgrims to the Lourdes sanctuary). In the early 1950s, when the strictures of the peace treaty had been much relaxed by the Allied authorities, the aircraft returned under full control of the Italian Air Force. One of the aircraft transferred to the Order of Malta, still with the Order's fuselage roundels, is preserved in the Italian Air Force Museum.

Logistics
The Military Corps has become known in mainland Europe for its operation of hospital trains, a service which was carried out intensively during both World Wars. The Military Corps still operates a modern 28-car hospital train with 192 hospital beds, serviced by a medical staff of 38 medics and paramedics provided by the Order and a technical staff provided by the Italian Army's Ferrovieri Engineer Regiment.

Orders, decorations, and medals 

 Order pro Merito Melitensi

See also 
 Knights Hospitaller
 List of Knights Hospitaller sites
 Order of Malta Ambulance Corps (Ireland)

Notes

References

Further reading 
 
 
 Colonna, Marcantonio, The Dictator Pope: The Inside Story of the Francis Papacy, Washington DC, Regnery Publishing, 2017–2018.
 
 
 
 
 
 List of Italian knights of the Order of Malta from 1136 to 1713: Elenco dei cavaleri del S.M.Ordine di San Giovanni di Gerusalemme by Francesco Bonazzi (Napoli: Libreria Detken & Rocholl, 1897)
 List of Italian knights of the Order of Malta from 1714 to 1907: Elenco dei cavaleri del S.M.Ordine di San Giovanni di Gerusalemme by Francesco Bonazzi (Napoli: Libreria Detken & Rocholl, 1907)
 List of members of the Order of Malta 1880: Ruolo generale del sov. mil. ordine di S. Giovanni de Gerulasemme ovvero di Malta (Roma: Tipografia Poliglotta della S. Congregazione di Propaganda Fide, 1880)

External links 

  
 Constitution of the Sovereign Military Order of Malta (in Italian)
 Permanent Observer Mission of the Order of Malta to the United Nations, IAEA and CTBTO in Vienna
 Permanent Observer Mission of the Order of Malta to the United Nations in New York
 The Order of Malta Magistral Post

 
Catholic orders of chivalry
Malta, Sovereign Military Order of
Orders following the Rule of Saint Benedict
Orders of chivalry under protection of the Holy See
Orders of chivalry in Europe
Orders of chivalry awarded to heads of state, consorts and sovereign family members
Organisations based in Rome
Religious organisations based in Italy
Malta, Sovereign Military Order of
History of Malta
Malta, Sovereign Military Order of
Catholic religious orders established in the 11th century
1090s establishments in the Kingdom of Jerusalem
1099 establishments in Asia
Malta, Sovereign Military Order of
Knights of Malta
Religion and politics